"Robots" is the third single from Kate Ryan's fifth studio album Electroshock. It was released in Belgium via iTunes on 12 May 2012.  The song's melody is based on the riff of the song Living on Video by Trans-X.

Track listing
Digital download - single
 "Robots" (radio edit) - 3:17
 "Robots" (extended version) - 5:28
 "Robots" (Shutterz remix) - 6:14
 "Robots" (Chris Feelding remix) - 4:47
 "Robots" (William Burstedt) - 3:33

Chart performance

Release history

References

External links

Kate Ryan songs
2012 singles
2010 songs